The Men's 3000 metres steeplechase at the 2010 Commonwealth Games as part of the athletics programme was held at the Jawaharlal Nehru Stadium on Monday 11 October 2010.

Records

Results

External links
2010 Commonwealth Games - Athletics

Women's 3000 metres steeplechase
2010